The seventeenth season of The Bachelor premiered on January 7, 2013. This season features 28-year-old Sean Lowe, a former Kansas State football player from Irving, Texas.

Lowe finished in third place on the eighth season of The Bachelorette featuring Emily Maynard. The season concluded on March 11, 2013, with Lowe choosing to propose to 26-year-old graphic designer Catherine Giudici. Lowe and Giudici married in January 2014, and currently live in Dallas, Texas with their two sons, Isaiah and Samuel, and daughter, Mia.

Production

Casting and contestants
Casting began during the airing of the sixteenth season of the show. First "The Bachelor" approached Tim Tebow, then-quarterback of the Denver Broncos; but he never signed an agreement. Lamar Hurd, a sportscaster from Portland, Oregon, had been another potential candidate, vying to become the first African-American "Bachelor." It wouldn't be until season twenty-five that would have an African-American Bachelor when Matt James later being chosen as the lead.

It was then announced on September 25, 2012, Sean Lowe was named as the Bachelor. Other rumored possible candidates included The Bachelorette season 6 winner Roberto Martinez, Lowe's The Bachelorette castmate and that season's runner-up Arie Luyendyk Jr., and eleven-time Olympic medalist Ryan Lochte. Luyendyk dropped out to focus on his racing career. Martinez and Lochte also declined. Luyendyk would go on to become the star of The Bachelor five seasons later.

Notable contestants include Bachelor Pad season 3 contestant and Bachelor Nation super fan Paige Vigil. Sarah Herron became the first disabled contestant in The Bachelor franchise who was born with one arm resulted with amniotic band syndrome.

Filming and development
This season traveled many places including Montana; the Canadian province of Alberta; St. Croix in the United States Virgin Islands; and Thailand. Appearances including Ben Taylor, Eli Young Band and Sarah Darling.

Contestants
25 potential new contestants were first revealed on September 25, 2012 for the first time in the show's history before filming had begun.

In the premiere episode, season 16 contestant Kacie Boguskie revealed as the mystery woman and competed in this season, bringing the total to 26.

Future appearances

Dancing with the Stars
Lowe competed in the sixteenth season of Dancing with the Stars.  He partnered with Peta Murgatroyd and finished 6th place.

The Bachelorette
Desiree Hartsock was chosen as the lead of season nine of The Bachelorette.

Bachelor in Paradise
Season 1

AshLee Frazier, Daniella McBride, Jackie Parr, and Sarah Herron returned for the inaugural season of Bachelor in Paradise. McBride was eliminated in week 1, while Frazier, Herron, and Parr were eliminated in week 7.

Season 3

Herron returned for the third season of Bachelor in Paradise. She was eliminated in week 3.

The Bachelor Winter Games
Murphy returned for The Bachelor Winter Games under Team USA. She finished as co-runner-up.

Call-out order

 The contestant received the first impression rose
 The contestant received a rose outside of a rose ceremony or date
 The contestant received a rose during the date
 The contestant was eliminated outside the rose ceremony
 The contestant was eliminated
 The contestant was eliminated during the date
 The contestant quit the competition
 The contestant won the competition

Episodes

References

External links

2013 American television seasons
The Bachelor (American TV series) seasons
Television shows filmed in California
Television shows filmed in Montana
Television shows filmed in Alberta
Television shows filmed in the United States Virgin Islands
Television shows filmed in Texas
Television shows filmed in Washington (state)
Television shows filmed in Missouri
Television shows filmed in Thailand